Ranunculoideae is a subfamily of the family Ranunculaceae. Ranunculoideae currently has ten accepted tribes.

Tribes

 Adonideae
 Asteropyreae
 Caltheae
 Nigelleae
 Delphinieae
 Cimicifugeae
 Helleboreae
 Callianthemeae
 Anemoneae
 Ranunculeae

References

Ranunculaceae
Eudicot subfamilies